This is a list of aristocratic families of the Royal City of Gdańsk (German: Danzig).

It encompasses minority Polish and majority Prussian (German) nobility.

A

B

C

D

E

F

G

H

I

J

K

L

M

N

O

P

R

S

T

U

V

W

Z

See also 
 List of people from Gdańsk
 List of mayors of Gdańsk
 List of mayors of Danzig

Sources 
 Gdańsk aristocratic families (http://www.gdansk.pl)
 Bojaruniec, Ewa: Social Advancement among Patrician Families in Gdańsk in the Late Middle Ages and the Early Modern Period, Acta Historica Universitatis Klaipedensis, XXIX, 2014, 150–170. ISSN 1392-4095. (PDF)


Aristocratic families